The Downtown Corinth Historic District in Corinth, Mississippi is a  historic district.  It was listed on the National Register of Historic Places in 1993, at which time it included the majority of Corinth's downtown commercial buildings.  The street plan of the area was laid out in 1855 by surveyors Houston Mitchell (1824-1877) and Hamilton Mask, who intended for the city to be named "Cross City".  The plan conformed to the rights-of-way granted to the Memphis & Charleston Railroad and the Mobile and Ohio Railroad lines;  the downtown area evolved from c.1855 to c.1941.

It includes 88 contributing buildings, 2 contributing sites, and a contributing object.  It includes:
Old U.S. Post Office, individually listed on the National Register
Coliseum Theatre, individually listed on the National Register
Corinth Depot

References

Historic districts on the National Register of Historic Places in Mississippi
Italianate architecture in Mississippi
Romanesque Revival architecture in Mississippi
Colonial Revival architecture in Mississippi
Buildings and structures completed in 1855
National Register of Historic Places in Alcorn County, Mississippi